Edgar S. Kelley (November 23, 1851 – June 29, 1929) was a member of the South Dakota House of Representatives.

Biography
Kelley was born on November 23, 1851 in Walworth County, Wisconsin. When he was a year old, he moved with his parents to Green County, Wisconsin. He moved to Grant County, South Dakota in 1879 and lived in Millbank

Career
Kelley was a member of the House of Representatives from 1903 to 1906. He was a Republican.

References

External links

People from Walworth County, Wisconsin
People from Green County, Wisconsin
People from Milbank, South Dakota
Republican Party members of the South Dakota House of Representatives
1851 births
1929 deaths